Numenius can refer to:

 Numenius of Apamea, Syrian Greek philosopher of the 2nd century CE
 Curlew, any of 9 species of birds grouped in the genus Numenius
 Numenius, son of Antiochus in 1 Maccabees 12:16
 Noumenios, Seleucid general and satrap of the 3rd/2nd century BCE